Cram schools in Hong Kong (also commonly known as "tutorial schools") are commercial organisations that cater principally to students preparing for public examinations at secondary school level, namely the Diploma of Secondary Education (HKDSE), and its precursors prior to 2012, Advanced Level and Certificate of Education (HKCEE) examinations.

Business model

Cram schools are relied upon by some primary school students and many secondary school students to endow them with techniques for public examinations in Hong Kong that determine students' acceptance to local universities. According to the Census and Statistics Department of Hong Kong, a third of secondary school students went for private tutoring in the 2004–05 school year, spending a total of HK$18.9 million per month (2.42 million). On the lower estimate, the whole industry is worth more than HK$400 million, and according to other reports, the industry is generating more than US$3.6 billion a year. Amongst these, Modern Education and Beacon College are the only listed operations.

These establishments cater to the 478 thousand secondary school students in Hong Kong (2008 figures). The schools focus on the two major local public examinations, namely HKDSE and HKALE. Cram schools focus on teaching examination techniques as well as providing students tips on topics which may appear on the coming examination. Monthly tuition fees per subject in 2009 were approximately HK$400 (US$51) for each student. The fee for a course, such as English, can be HK$100 per hour. In 2015, fees were stable at around HK$500, due to tough competition amongst tuition centres and falling school rolls due to demographic factors. The use of video tutorials, pioneered by Kevin Ko, has become a permanent feature in the industry in Hong Kong. Multimedia technology has permitted the leveraging of classes simultaneously to hundreds of students at two or more different locations.

The Hong Kong Federation of Youth Groups surveyed 524 year five to year twelve pupils in 2012, 63 per cent of respondents said they were being tutored; approximately 56 per cent of those spent at least HK$1,000 a month on tuition fees. The popularity of tutoring has been fuelled by aggressive social pressures and competition for university places for subjects such as medicine and law.

Tutor profiles 
Tutors are independent contractors to cram schools, who share their revenue with tutors. Tutors on the other hand bear their own overheads, such as advertising and promotion expenses; many hire assistants to research course materials and to answer students' queries. The share of gross revenues paid to tutors may depend on their bargaining power (popularity), and whether classes are live or virtual. Media reported that the more successful amongst these are able to obtain a 60% share. Some liken themselves to stage performers, so cultivate their images and daily rehearse new content or delivery. There are said to be approximately 20 such 'star tutors' in number within the industry in 2007, who made monthly gross revenues of HK$1 million or above. Public disclosures made during the 2014/15 fiscal year by two leading cram schools indicated that Modern Education paid fees ranging from about HK$2 million to around HK$15 million to five tutors; Beacon College paid its top tutor HK$35 million in the same year, and another four tutors averaged approximately HK$4.8 million each. By comparison, Hong Kong secondary school teachers earnings are capped at $68,915, and a primary school teacher was earning maximum $52,815 in 2009. Some of the tutors, or "presenters", are model-turned.

The schools apply a fandom approach to promote tutors, who dress fashionably and are given nicknames like "the Godfather of Science," "Brand-A tutor", "Super tutor" or the "Queen of English." They can be seen on billboards, full-page newspaper ads and TV screens in railway stations or on buses. Some of them have their own teams of stylists, fashion designers and photographers; many have personal web sites. Ken Ng, founder of Modern Education, claims credit for initiating this trend, and for "liberat[ing] the very feudal education system" whilst making a lot of money.

Unlike individual private tutors who advertise on sites such as adpost, kijiji and craiglist, cram schools regularly spend a lot on millions on front pages of papers, on the MTR and on buses. Multimedia techniques are increasingly deployed. To increase yield, once traditional classes are now supplemented by classes transmitted by video feed. Since around 2004, tutors have produced promotional videos for posting to YouTube.

In late 2015, media reported that Modern Education was overtly trying to poach a "star tutor" employed by a competitor. The tutor, likely to have been responsible for over 40 percent of the fees generated by rival Beacon College, was reported to have been offered a lucrative package representing an estimated HK$85 million (US$10.97 million) a year. The package included $30 million signing bonus plus 65% of all the revenue he generates throughout his 4-year contract period. Modern Education took out full-page advertising in two local journals to vaunt its offer publicly. Beacon College had revealed in its 2015 application for listing of the HK Stock Exchange that it made HK$236.4 million, HK$337.9 million, and HK$327.8 million in 2013, 2014 and 2015, respectively, and that its unnamed “top one tutor” was responsible for generating 43.6 percent, 45.5 percent and 40.5 percent of its turnover in those three years respectively. The brazen attempt of Modern Education to poach the Chinese tutor signalled to investors the extent that these schools may be dependent on a single teacher.

Criticism and controversies
Fernando Cheung, a member of the Legislative Council panel on education questioned the purpose of the money fuelling Hong Kong’s cram culture. Cheung said: “Our children are pushed into a system where they have to go through exercise after exercise, extracurricular activities, exam preparation and all that. Even when kids take up activities in arts and sports, they’re just there to be competitive and put one more thing on their resumes”.

In May 2008, the Independent Commission Against Corruption of Hong Kong stepped in to investigate allegations that HKCEE examination papers had been bought, and that K. Oten of Modern Education had sent out an analysis the current year's paper to examination candidates by text message during the exam. His employers immediately distanced themselves, saying he had been terminated. Oten had previously been dismissed by King's Glory in April 2006 on several counts of violating his employment contract. The court found him in breach, and ordered him to pay HK$8.87 million in damages to his former employers.

For his satirical dramatisation of the tutoring sector entitled Trick or Cheat 《愛出貓》, Hong Kong director Oxide Pang was sued by one of the sector's biggest stars for libel. Kevin Ko, co-founder of Ever Learning, alleges the film was a libellous portrayal of him. The film's main character, named Seven Ko, uses all manner of unethical means, including bribery and having sex with an exams official to gain access to examination questions.

In 2002 and again in 2010, Chinese star tutor Siu Yuen became embroiled in controversies when his teaching manuals included essay answers that bore uncanny resemblances to the year end examinations. His teaching materials for written Chinese in 2010 included notes on how to write an essay on a cinema on fire, which turned out to closely resemble a written question the fifth form Chinese public exam the same year. Siu was accused of possessing insider knowledge.

Notable cram schools in Hong Kong 
According to the Education Bureau, there are almost 7,500 tutorial centres and branches across Hong Kong. The ones with larger scale operations include:
Beacon College – 15 locations (2019)
King's Glory Education Centre– 7 locations (2019)
Modern Education – 8 locations (2019)
 Logic Tutorial Center– 18 locations (2019)
 Calvin Sun Education – 3 locations (2019)

References

External links 
"Hong Kong's celebrity tutors". The Standard, 16 October 2012

Academic pressure in East Asian culture
Education in Hong Kong
School types